John George Bischoff (October 28, 1894 – December 28, 1981) was a backup catcher who played in Major League Baseball from  to . Listed at 5' 7", 165 lb., Bischoff batted and threw right-handed. He was affectionately nicknamed "Smiley".

A native of Granite City, Illinois, Bischoff was one of the first foreign ballplayers to play in Cuban baseball as a member of the Habana BBC in 1923. He reached the majors in 1925 with the Chicago White Sox, appearing in seven games with them before moving to the Boston Red Sox during the midseason. In part of two major league seasons, he was a .262 hitter (71-for-271) with one home run and 35 RBI in 107 games, including 20 runs, 20 doubles, three triples, and two stolen bases.

Bischoff died in his home town of Granite City at the age of 87.

References

External links

Retrosheet

1894 births
1981 deaths
Baseball players from Illinois
Major League Baseball catchers
Chicago White Sox players
Boston Red Sox players